André Comte-Sponville (born 12 March 1952) is a French philosopher.

Biography
André Comte-Sponville was born in Paris, France. He studied in the École Normale Supérieure and earned a PhD from Panthéon-Sorbonne University, and is aggregated in philosophy. He is a proponent of atheism and materialism, but in a particular form, because of his spiritualistic aim.

The most important aspect of his work is an overcoming of traditional materialistic atheism in a perspective of post-materialism, because he demonstrates a spiritualization of atheism. This is especially present in his essay , published in 2006.

Bibliography 
 Traité du désespoir et de la béatitude (2 volumes, 1984-1988)
 Une éducation philosophique (1989)
 L'amour la solitude (1992)
 Petit Traité des Grandes Vertus (A Small Treatise on the Great Virtues or A Short Treatise on the Great Virtues) (1995), Translated into English by Catherine Temerson, Vintage, 2003, 
 Valeur et vérité (Etudes cyniques) (1995),
 Impromptus (1996)
 La sagesse des Modernes, written with Luc Ferry
 L'être temps (1999)
 Présentation de la philosophie (2000) (The Little Book of Philosophy) (2005), Translated into English by Frank Wynne, Vintage, 2005,  
 Le bonheur, désespérément (2000)
 Le capitalisme est-il moral? (2004)
 L'esprit de l'athéisme (2006) Translation: The Book of Atheist Spirituality, Bantam (2009) 
 Le miel et l'absinthe : Poésie et philosophie chez Lucrèce (2008)
 Le tragique de la décision médicale : La mort d'un enfant ou la naissance de l'absurde with Denis Devictor (2008)

Audio
 "Le bonheur - visions occidentale et chinoise", a three CD spoken word audio conference and discussion with Francois Julien, 2007.

References

External links
 Brief interview with André Comte-Sponville (video)
 Comte-Sponville's website

1952 births
Living people
Writers from Paris
École Normale Supérieure alumni
Pantheon-Sorbonne University alumni
Academic staff of the University of Paris
Continental philosophers
French materialists
French atheists
Atheist philosophers
French atheism activists
20th-century French philosophers
21st-century French philosophers
21st-century French writers
French male non-fiction writers